Sarracenia alata, also known as yellow trumpets, pale pitcher plant or pale trumpet, is a carnivorous plant in the genus Sarracenia. It is native to North America.

Distribution
Like all Sarracenia species, Sarracenia alata is native to the New World and grows in permanently wet and open wetlands typically classified as longleaf pine (Pinus palustris) savannas. The Pale pitcher plant's habitat is split into two geographically separate areas: an eastern range from eastern Louisiana across southern Mississippi and into western Alabama and a western range from eastern Texas into western Louisiana. In Mississippi, stands of Sarracenia alata rival in size those of any other Sarracenia species.

Description
Among members of Sarracenia the floral coloring of Sarracenia alata is remarkably varied. Flowers may be cream to white, greenish, yellow or reddish. As the floral color variations exist within populations hundreds of miles from any other Sarracenia species, these variations cannot be attributed to hybridization.
Other than the range of floral colors, Sarracenia alata differs little from Sarracenia rubra. The veining of Sarracenia rubra pitchers tends to be more reticulated whereas that of Sarracenia alata often exhibits more of a pinstripe pattern and grows taller pitchers.

References

Further reading 
 D’Amato, Peter. 1998. The Savage Garden: Cultivating Carnivorous Plants. Ten Speed Press, Berkeley. 

alata
Carnivorous plants of North America
Endemic flora of the United States
Flora of the Southeastern United States
Flora of Alabama
Flora of Mississippi
Flora of Texas